Suggestionata is a 1978 Italian drama film directed by Alfredo Rizzo and starring Eleonora Giorgi and Gabriele Ferzetti.

Plot

Cast
Gabriele Ferzetti as Gregorio 
Eleonora Giorgi as Anna 
Gioia Scola as Rachele 
Giampiero Albertini as Francesco
Piero Gerlini as The Inspector

References

External links

1978 films
Italian drama films
1970s Italian-language films
1970s Italian films